The list of Florida hurricanes from the 21st century has been marked by several devastating North Atlantic hurricanes; 79 tropical or subtropical cyclones, their remnants, or their precursors have affected the U.S. state of Florida. Collectively, cyclones in Florida during the time period resulted in more than $123 billion in damage and 450 deaths. Every year included at least one tropical cyclone affecting the state. During the 2004 season, more than one out of every five houses in the state received damage. After Wilma in 2005, it would be 11 years until another hurricane would strike the state, Hermine in 2016. The following year, Irma in 2017, was the first major hurricane to strike the state in 12 years.

The strongest hurricane to hit the state during the time period was Hurricane Michael, which was a Category 5 on the Saffir–Simpson scale, the highest category on the scale. Michael was the strongest hurricane to strike the contiguous United States since Hurricane Andrew in 1992. Additionally, hurricanes Charley, Jeanne, Dennis, Wilma, Irma, and Ian, made landfall on the state as major hurricanes.

2000

 August 23 – Hurricane Debby was forecasted to move through the Florida Keys as a hurricane, which prompted a mandatory evacuation for all non-residents. However, Debby dissipated before its remnant tropical wave, produced heavy rainfall and strong winds across southern Florida.
Hundreds of homes are damaged from floodwaters or fallen trees, and damage in the state amounts to at least $5.1 million (2000 USD). A surfer drowns in rough seas near Pensacola.
 September 22 – Tropical Storm Helene hits near Pensacola, damaging hundreds of homes from floodwaters. Monetary damage totals over $1 million (2000 USD).
 October 3 – The precursor disturbance to Tropical Storm Leslie produces  of rainfall across southeastern Florida, flooding about 93,000 houses. The flooding causes $950 million in damage (2000 USD), along with three indirect deaths.

2001

The rainfall destroys 10 homes and damages 599 others, with monetary damage totaling $20 million (2001 USD). Eight people died in the state, five of which due to rip currents.
The storm kills two in the state and leaves $1.5 million in damage (2001 USD).
The combination of flooding from rainfall and gusty winds causes $230 million in damage (2001 USD) and one direct death, and high waves from the storm indirectly kills a person in the Florida Keys.
The hurricane spawns two tornadoes, resulting in $16,000 of damage (2001 USD).

2002

 July 13 – The precursor disturbance to Tropical Storm Arthur moved across the Florida Panhandle days before developing off the Carolinas. The system dropped heavy rainfall in Florida, reaching  in Weston.
 August 4 – High surf from Tropical Storm Bertha killed one person at Perdido Key State Recreation Area.
 August 9 – Lifeguards rescued more than 25 swimmers in Volusia County due to high surf from Tropical Storm Cristobal.
 September 4 – Tropical Storm Edouard made landfall near Ormond Beach as a weakening tropical storm. While crossing the peninsula from east to west, the storm dropped heavy rainfall, reaching  in DeSoto City; this caused some flooding.
 September 14 – While moving ashore the northern gulf coast, Tropical Storm Hanna produced rip currents that killed three people along the Florida panhandle. It also dropped heavy rainfall in the state, reaching  near Chipley.
 September 26 – While Tropical Storm Isidore hit southern Louisiana, its large circulation dropped heavy rainfall across Florida, reaching  in Milton. Rip currents killed a man in Manatee County. Tornadoes spawned by the storm damage multiple mobile homes, with monetary damage across the state totaling over $11 million (2002 USD).
 October 3 – Hurricane Lili makes landfall on southern Louisiana, and drops  of rainfall in Pensacola.

2003

 April 20 – Swells from Tropical Storm Ana capsized a boat near Jupiter, killing two of the four passengers aboard.
 June 30 – While Tropical Storm Bill moved ashore southern Louisiana, its outer rainbands dropped  in Milligan. Rip currents killed two people in Panama City Beach. Floodwaters damaged at least 40 houses, resulting in $1 million in damage.
 July 2003 – A man died in Navarre after suffering a heart attack while swimming in high surf caused by Hurricane Claudette.
 July 25 – Tropical Depression Seven formed to the east of the state and dropped light precipitation.
 August 14 – The precursor to Hurricane Erika moved westward across the state before developing in the eastern Gulf of Mexico.
 August 30 – While Tropical Storm Grace moved ashore Texas, its outer periphery dropped rainfall across much of Florida.
 September 6 – Tropical Depression Henri hit Clearwater, before crossing the state. Rainfall in the state reached  in Hialeah, which caused some flooding Lightning caused by the storm injured a man in Lee County.
 September 13 – Rip currents from Hurricane Isabel killed a surfer in Nassau County.

2004

 August 12 – Tropical Storm Bonnie moved ashore the panhandle near Saint Vincent Island as a weakening storm. Rains in the state reached  in Milligan.
 August 13 – Hurricane Charley struck southwestern Florida as a Category 4 hurricane, the strongest landfall in the continental United States since Hurricane Andrew in 1992. Its eye crossed Cayo Costa and later the mainland at Punta Gorda, before crossing the state with much of its intensity retained. The winds damaged or destroyed thousands of homes, knocked down tens of thousands of trees, and left more than 2 million Floridians without power. Charley also spawned nine tornadoes across the state. Rainfall associated with the hurricane reached  in Bud Slough. Charley resulted in 34 deaths across the state, as well as 792 injuries, and damage was estimated at $16 billion, at the time the second-costliest American hurricane.
 September 5 – Hurricane Frances made landfall along the southern end of Hutchinson Island as a Category 2 hurricane, and moved slowly across the state, making a second landfall along the gulf coast near New Port Richey. Wind gusts reached  at Fort Pierce. The storm produced an estimated  storm surge along Florida's east coast, which damaged marinas, piers, and other coastal property. The storm also produced 23 tornadoes in the state as part of a widespread outbreak. At least 1.7 million people lost power during the storm, and more than 17,000 buildings were damaged in Palm Beach County alone. During its passage, Frances led to 37 deaths, as well as $9.8 billion in damage.
Rainfall from the storm reached  in Pensacola. The hurricane also produced an extensive tornado outbreak, including 18 that touched down in Florida. The strong winds knocked down many trees along the panhandle, causing prolonged power outages. The remnants of Ivan later crossed over the southern portion of the state after looping southward, eventually reforming in the Gulf of Mexico on September 23. Damage in the state totaled over $4 billion, and 29 people died from the hurricane.
 September 25 – Hurricane Jeanne made landfall in southeastern Florida very near where Frances struck three weeks prior, and moved northwestward across the state, bringing hurricane-force winds to the same areas affected by Charley and Frances. Wind gusts reached  in Fort Pierce. Heavy rainfall from Jeanne reached  at Kenansville. Statewide damage was estimated at $7.5 billion, and there were six deaths.

2005

Rainfall reached  in Naples. Rip currents from the storm killed a swimmer in Miami Beach. Damage was estimated at $3.5 million.
 July 6 – While Hurricane Cindy moved ashore the northern gulf coast, its large circulation dropped light rainfall and knocked down trees in the panhandle.

 July 10 – Hurricane Dennis made landfall just west of Navarre Beach as a major hurricane. Dennis produced nine tornadoes in the state, along with heavy rainfall that reached  at a station near Bristol. High storm tides caused major beach erosion and coastal damage along the panhandle. Statewide damage was estimated at $1.5 billion, and there were 14 deaths in the state related to Dennis.

About 1.4 million people lost power during the storm. Later, when Katrina made its devastating landfall along the northern gulf coast, its large circulation produced high tides, light rainfall, and gusty winds along the western Florida panhandle. The hurricane killed 14 people across the state, and damage was estimated at $623 million.
The storm also produced high surf along the coast, which killed a swimmer in Palm Beach County. Rains in the state reached  in Hastings.
 September 20 – Hurricane Rita passed south of the Florida Keys before entering the Gulf of Mexico.
Rainfall reached  at Naval Station Mayport.

 October 24 – Hurricane Wilma made landfall near Cape Romano as a major hurricane, with sustained hurricane-force winds recorded across the Miami area. Wind gusts reached  on Marco Island. The strong winds left widespread wind damage, with fallen trees and power lines, damaged roofs, and lost crops. About 98% of South Florida lost power during the storm. A significant storm surge – estimated around  near Marathon – inundated the Florida Keys. Rainfall during the storm reached  at Kennedy Space Center. Wilma also spawned 10 tornadoes across the state. There were 30 deaths in the state related to Wilma, and statewide damage was estimated at $19 billion, making Wilma among the costliest United States hurricanes.

2006

 June 13 – Tropical Storm Alberto hit the Big Bend region. While crossing the state, it produced a storm surge that flooded dozens of buildings, as well as heavy rainfall that reached  near Tarpon Springs.
 August 30 – Tropical Storm Ernesto struck Plantation Key and subsequently moved across the southeastern portion of the state. The storm spawned two tornadoes in the state. Rainfall in the state reached  in South Golden Gate, which flooded houses. There were two traffic fatalities in the Miami metro area related to the storm.

2007

 May 9 – Subtropical Storm Andrea passed offshore northeastern Florida. Its large waves killed a surfer in New Smyrna Beach, while also causing beach erosion and coastal flooding.
 June 2 – Tropical Depression Barry made landfall near Tampa, bringing beneficial rainfall, as well as two tornadoes, to the state. Slick roads led to two traffic fatalities.
 August 23 – Rip currents from Hurricane Dean killed one person at Siesta Key.
 September 8 – Rough surf from Tropical Storm Gabrielle drowned one surfer and forced the rescue of 200 swimmers.
 September 13 – Hurricane Humberto moved ashore southeastern Texas, and its outskirts dropped light rainfall on the western Florida Panhandle.
 September 22 – Tropical Depression Ten moved ashore near Fort Walton Beach. Its precursor produced two tornadoes over southern Florida, along with heavy rainfall reaching  at Hastings.
 October 31 – The interaction between Hurricane Noel and a ridge produced  wind gusts, as well as large waves that caused beach erosion, costing at least $3 million.
 December 16 – The remnant circulation of Tropical Storm Olga struck the state near Tampa, producing hurricane-force wind gusts and a tornado that caused about $1 million in damage.

2008

 July 16 – The precursor to Tropical Storm Cristobal dropped  of precipitation was reported, causing some street flooding.
 July 22 – Rough surf from Hurricane Dolly killed one person along the panhandle.
 August 3 – Rip currents from Tropical Storm Edouard killed three people along the panhandle.
 August 18 – Tropical Storm Fay made the first of a record four landfalls in Florida, moving from the Florida Keys, crossing the southern portion of the state, and later turning to the west where it crossed the peninsula and later struck the panhandle. Fay dropped heavy rainfall across the state, peaking at  near Melbourne; the rains caused widespread flooding that affected more than 15,000 homes. A tornado outbreak resulted in 19 twisters in the state, the strongest of which was an EF2. Damage in the state reached at least $195 million. The storm led to 15 deaths in the state.
 August 31 – Hurricane Gustav brushed the Florida Keys before tracking into central Louisiana. Rip currents from the hurricane killed four people in Florida. The storm also produced six tornadoes in the state.
 September 5 – Hurricane Hanna passed east of the state while moving toward the Carolinas. Rip currents and high seas killed three people in the state.
 September 8 – As Hurricane Ike moved through Cuba, its outer bands dropped heavy rainfall in South Florida, and spawned two tornadoes in the Upper Florida Keys.
 November 14 – The remnants of Hurricane Paloma brought heavy rainfall to the Florida panhandle.

2009

 August 16–18 – Tropical Storm Claudette hit Santa Rosa Island on the panhandle, killing two people due to drowning. The storm also produced rainfall, gusty winds, and slightly above normal tides. An EF-0 tornado in Cape Coral damaged 11 homes, leaving $103,000 in damage.
 August 21–22 – Hurricane Bill produced waves between  along the east coast of Florida, resulting in one fatality at New Smyrna Beach.
 August 28 – Wave heights reached  from Tropical Storm Danny off eastern Florida.
 November 10 – Former Hurricane Ida struck southern Alabama and later moved into the Florida panhandle as an extratropical cyclone. The storm caused scattered power outages and downed trees.

2010

 June 30 – As Tropical Storm Alex moved across the Gulf of Mexico, its high tides washed tarballs from the Deepwater Horizon oil spill onto the Florida panhandle.
 July 23 – Tropical Storm Bonnie made landfall near Cutler Bay, Florida as a minimal tropical storm, bringing light rainfall and winds to southern parts of the state.
 August 10 – Tropical Depression Five developed off the southwest coast, producing high surf that led to two deaths along Anna Maria Island.
 August 28 – High surf from distant Hurricane Danielle killed a man in Satellite Beach, while dozens of other people had to be rescued by lifeguards.
 August 31 – September 4 – Hurricane Earl paralleled the East Coast of the United States, resulting in rip currents and wave heights up to  along the eastern coastline of Florida. Three people were killed in the state: a 61-year-old charter boat captain who suffered grave injuries after falling off his boat approaching Jupiter Inlet, a 16-year-old who was rescued by a bystander but later died at the hospital, and a 57-year-old Swedish sailor whose boat was found but body was never recovered.
 September 19 – Distant Hurricane Igor produced high surf along the east coast of Florida.
 September 29 – The extratropical remnants of Tropical Storm Nicole passed southeast of the state, although it dropped heavy rainfall in South Florida, reaching  of rainfall in North Key Largo. Street flooding occurred in the upper Florida Keys and Miami Beach.
 October 16 – Hurricane Paula dissipated over Cuba, although its outer rainbands produced two waterspouts in the Florida Keys.

2011

 July 18–20 – Tropical Storm Bret generated wave heights of  along the eastern coastline of Florida, injuring several beach-goers and prompting the rescue of dozens of others.
 August 25–26 – Hurricane Irene passed east of the state as a major hurricane, generating waves of  around Jacksonville Beach and Atlantic Beach. The high waves killed two people along the coast from drowning. Wind gusts reached  in the state, strong enough to knock down trees and cause minor power outages. 
 September 4 – Tropical Storm Lee moved ashore the northern gulf coast, producing  of rainfall across the extreme western Panhandle. Moderate beach erosion and prolonged rip currents affected the region. There were four tornadoes in the state related to the storm.
 September 5 – Swells from distant Hurricane Katia killed a swimmer in Ormond Beach.
 October 28–31 – Moisture from Hurricane Rina combined with a stalled front, leading to heavy rainfall across South Florida, reaching  in Boca West. Many cities record their top-10-wettest October on record. Over 160 homes and buildings suffer water inundation, and numerous streets are closed, particularly in Broward County.
 November 9–10 – Long-distance swells generated by Tropical Storm Sean produced numerous strong rip currents along the eastern coastline, drowning a 34-year-old female and injuring two others.

2012

 May 28–30 – Tropical Storm Beryl made landfall near Jacksonville Beach, becoming the strongest off-season storm to strike the United States. Wind gusts in Florida reached  on Buck Island. The storm also dropped heavy rainfall, reaching  in Wellborn. Trees and power lines were damaged, while a few tornadoes result in modest damage. A teenager died in high seas in Daytona Beach.
 June 23–27 – Tropical Storm Debby moved ashore western Florida near Steinhatchee as a weak yet sprawling storm, producing catastrophic flooding across northern and central Florida. Rainfall accumulations peaked at  near Curtis Mill, resulting in hundreds of damaged homes and record river flooding. Debby also spawned 24 tornadoes, most of them weak. The storm killed seven people throughout the state, and left at least $105 million in damage.

 August 25–29 – Tropical Storm Isaac passed just southwest of Key West, although its effects in the Florida Keys were minimal. Across southern Florida, Isaac dropped heavy rainfall in southern Florida, reaching  in Loxahatchee. The storm also spawned five tornadoes. The storm led to two deaths in the state from traffic accidents. Damage in the state totaled over $48 million. The threat of Isaac caused the first day of the 2012 Republican National Convention in Tampa to be canceled.
Winds from the storm reached  in the state, strong enough to leave about 1,000 people without power.

2013

 June 6 – Tropical Storm Andrea made landfall in northwestern Florida near Steinhatchee and continued northeastward through the state. Andrea produced 10 tornadoes in the state, as well as heavy rainfall reaching  in North Miami Beach, which caused flooding.
 August 3 – Lightning struck a man in Hialeah, related to Tropical Depression Dorian passing east of the state.
 October 7 – The remnants of Tropical Storm Karen moved across the Florida panhandle, with a statewide peak rainfall of  recorded in Panama City.

2014

 August 4 – Two people required rescue off the coast of Jacksonville due to rip currents from Hurricane Bertha.
September 17 – Rip currents from distant Hurricane Edouard affected the east coast of Florida.

2015

 Early May – Rainfall reached  in Hollywood from Tropical Storm Ana developing east of the state.
 August 30–31 – The remnants of Tropical Storm Erika dropped heavy rainfall in southern Florida, reaching  at a station northwest of Sweetwater. Minor flash flooding left streets in Wynwood impassable.
 October 1–2 – Hurricane Joaquin indirectly caused a period of high tides along Florida's east coast, due to its interaction with a developing low near the state drawing moisture from the hurricane. Tides reached  in Fernandina Beach.
 October 26- The remnants of Hurricane Patricia brought heavy rains and high winds gusts to 70 mph in Florida Panhandle.

2016

 May 29 – Rip currents from Tropical Storm Bonnie killed a swimmer in Melbourne Beach, while dozens of other people required rescue.
 June 6 – Tropical Storm Colin made landfall in the Big Bend of Florida at Apalachee Bay, and moved quickly northeastward through the state. Wind gusts in the state reached  at Kennedy Space Center. Heavy rainfall, peaking at  near Seminole, caused some flooding. Three people drowned along the Florida Panhandle due to rip currents.
Hermine moved ashore with a  storm surge, which occurred alongside heavy rainfall that peaked at  near Tarpon Springs. Hermine damaged or destroyed more than 2,600 buildings and left more than 253,000 people without power. A man died in Ocala after being struck by a tree. Insured damage in the state reached US$80 million. 
The storm spawned a brief EF0 tornado near Barefoot Bay, which damaged a roof.

The western edge of the eyewall passed over Cape Canaveral, producing wind gusts of  there. Matthew's strong winds knocked down trees and power lines, leaving 1.36 million people without power. The hurricane produced widespread beach erosion from its high waves and storm surge, with portions of State Route A1A washed out, and millions of dollars' worth of equipment damaged at Kennedy Space Center. There were 14 deaths in the state related to the hurricane. Statewide damage totaled at least $1.3 billion.
October 12 – Swells from Hurricane Nicole combined with the annual king tide to produce coastal flooding in South Florida.

2017

 June 22 – While moving ashore Louisiana, Tropical Storm Cindy brought heavy rainfall to the Florida Panhandle, reaching , which caused minor flooding. The storm spawned an EF0 tornado in southern Okaloosa County.
Heavy rainfall reached  near Naples, causing flooding. The storm also produced an EF0 tornado in Manatee County. Statewide damage was estimated at $10 million.
August 26–September 1 – As Tropical Storm Harvey made its final landfall in Louisiana, its outer rainbands dropped rainfall to the Florida panhandle, causing some flooding.

The hurricane caused or contributed to at least 87 deaths in the state, with possibly over 400 deaths related to the storm. Storm damage was heaviest in the Florida Keys, where Irma's storm surge damaged or destroyed more than 1,300 boats. Heavy damage occurred around the Miami metropolitan area. Strong winds, heavy rainfall, and tornadoes affected the rest of the state as Irma moved northward, with a statewide rainfall peak of  recorded in Fort Pierce. Record flooding occurred in northeastern Florida, including in Jacksonville. Irma left an estimated $50 billion in damage.
September 24 – Rip currents from Hurricane Maria affected the state's east coast, prompting at least 22 water rescues.
October 7–8 – Hurricane Nate moved ashore Mississippi, while producing a  storm surge in the western Florida panhandle, which damaged part of State Road 399.
 October 29 – Tropical Storm Philippe and an associated trough produced heavy rainfall across southern Florida, reaching  at Boynton Beach. The weather system also produced three weak tornadoes.

2018

The storm dropped heavy rainfall to the east over the Florida panhandle, reaching  at Taylor Creek on the northern shore of Lake Okeechobee. Gusty winds knocked down trees, causing some power outages. In Port Salerno, Alberto spawned a brief EF0 tornado. 
 September 3 – Tropical Storm Gordon moved over the Florida Keys and extreme southwestern Florida. The storm caused slick roads that led to a fatal car crash on I-95 near Miami. Gordon later moved ashore southern Mississippi; its outer rainbands knocked down a tree near Pensacola, killing a young child.
 September 9–18– Rip currents from distant Hurricane Florence killed a man in New Smyrna Beach and Playalinda Beach.
Michael killed 50 people in Florida, seven of them directly related to the storm's impacts. Statewide economic damage was estimated at $18.4 billion, with catastrophic damage in Mexico Beach and Tyndall Air Force Base.

2019

July 10–15 – Rip currents from Hurricane Barry killed a man in Panama City Beach.
July 23 – Lightning from Tropical Depression Three struck a woman in Aventura as the depression approached the state's southeast coast.
August 24 – The precursor low to Tropical Storm Erin moved across the southeastern portion of the state.
 September 1–4 – For two days, the NHC forecasted that powerful Hurricane Dorian would move ashore southeastern Florida. The hurricane ultimately stalled over The Bahamas and remained east of the state. Wind gusts reached  in New Smyrna Beach. Three people in the state died indirectly due to the hurricane – one person was electrocuted while trimming trees ahead of the storm, and two people died while preparing their homes. Damage totaled around $10 million in Duval County.
 September 12–13, 2019 – Rip currents from Tropical Storm Humberto killed a man in St. Johns County.
 September 30, 2019 – Large swells and rip currents generated by Hurricane Lorenzo killed a man in Vero Beach.
 October 18, 2019 – Former Tropical Storm Nestor transitioned into an extratropical cyclone and struck the Florida panhandle, causing storm surge flooding along the coast. Rainfall in the state reached  in Pinellas County, resulting in street flooding. Nestor spawned at least three tornadoes in the state and left about 10,000 people without power.

2020 

 May 13–14 – The precursor of Tropical Storm Arthur produced heavy rainfall across southern Florida, which resulted in an injury in Hollywood when the rains caused a ceiling to collapse.
The rains flooded homes and roadways, especially in close proximity to canals. The storm caused the planned Crew Dragon Demo-2 launch from Cape Canaveral to be canceled.
 June 6–7 – While moving northward through the Gulf of Mexico, Tropical Storm Cristobal spawned six tornadoes in Florida, including an EF1 near Orlando that damaged 42 homes and buildings.
 July 6 – The precursor low to Tropical Storm Fay moved ashore the Florida gulf coast, later developing into a tropical storm off the east coast of the United States.
 July 22 – Rip currents from Hurricane Hanna killed a swimmer in Sandestin Beach along the gulf coast.
 August 1–3 – Tropical Storm Isaias paralleled the east coast of Florida, dropping substantial amounts of rainfall and causing power outages to about 3,000 people in South Florida.
 August 23–24 – Hurricane Marco dropped heavy rainfall on the Florida Panhandle, reaching  in Apalachicola, causing some flooding.
 August 26 – A strong squall from Tropical Storm Laura bought strong, gusty winds to Key West, causing sporadic damage. High surf and rip currents from the storm also caused a first responder to drown in St. George Island while trying to save two other swimmers.
The city also recorded a  storm surge, which was the third-highest water level there after Hurricane Ivan in 2004 and the 1926 Miami hurricane. Sally dropped torrential rainfall across where it moved ashore, reaching  near Pensacola. The rains and the storm surge caused significant flooding, resulting in hundreds of rescues. The storm damaged or destroyed thousands of structures. Three people died in Florida related to Sally, two due to drowning and one related to carbon monoxide poisoning while using a generator indoors. Damage in Escambia County alone totaled $309 million.
 October 4 – Rainbands from Tropical Storm Gamma near Mexico's Yucatán peninsula also produced rainfall in Florida.
 October 10 – Rip currents from Hurricane Delta killed two swimmers along the gulf coast.
 November 7–9 – Tropical Storm Eta made two landfalls in Florida, bringing strong winds, storm surge, heavy rainfall, and flash flooding to much of the state.

2021 

These radar observations along with velocity data depicted Mindy with a well-defined circulation and spiral banding upon landfall. Over the next few hours, Mindy pushed inland across Florida's Big Bend region, skirting to the south of Tallahassee.

2022 

 June 4 – The precursor system to Tropical Storm Alex caused flash flooding in South Florida, inflicting minor damage to the area.
 September 26–30 – Hurricane Ian passed through Florida throughout late September 2022. Ian first went over Dry Tortugas National Park in the Florida Keys as a Category 3 storm on September 26 and 27. Ian rapidly intensified before making landfall at Cayo Costa and Punta Gorda as a high-end Category 4 storm, respectively. Ian brought massive storm surge to Southwestern Florida, where over 1 million people lost electricity. Ian's outer bands also caused damage near Miami, where tornadoes were reported. Ian also brought massive damage to Central and Northeastern Florida.
As well, Nicole became only the third November hurricane to make landfall in Florida on record, alongside the 1935 Yankee hurricane and Hurricane Kate in 1985.

Monthly statistics

Deadly storms
The following is a list of hurricanes with all known deaths in the state associated with a storm.

See also

 List of Cuba hurricanes
 Hurricanes in the Bahama Archipelago

Notes

References

 2000
Hurricanes
Hurricanes
Hurricanes
Florida 2000
Florida, 2000-2020
Hurricanes, 2000-2020